Ochrodota pronapides is a moth of the subfamily Arctiinae first described by Herbert Druce in 1894. It is found in Panama, Suriname, Ecuador and Amazonas.

References

Phaegopterina